The Republic of Korea competed at the 2011 World Championships in Athletics from August 27 to September 4 in Daegu, South Korea as the host nation.

Team selection

A team of 63 athletes was
announced to represent the country
in the event.  The team was led by 110-meter hurdler Park Tae-kyong.
Furthermore, the team includes 3 athletes invited by the IPC for exhibition
events: Jung Dong-ho and Yoo Byung-hoon, 400m T53 (wheelchair) men, and Kang Kyung-sun, 800m T54 (wheelchair) women.

The following athletes appeared on the preliminary Entry List, but not on the Official Start List of the specific event, resulting in a total number of 53 competitors:

Results

Men

Decathlon

Women

References

External links
Official local organising committee website
Official IAAF competition website

Nations at the 2011 World Championships in Athletics
World Championships in Athletics
2011